The following is a list of the 17 municipalities (comuni) of the Province of Massa-Carrara, Tuscany, Italy.

List

See also 
List of municipalities of Italy

References 

Massa-Carrara